The black crested gibbon (Nomascus concolor) is a Critically Endangered species of gibbon found in China, Laos, and northern Vietnam, with four subspecies.

Taxonomy 

The taxonomy of the species is confused. Previously grouped in the genus Hylobates, currently four subspecies are recognised.

Central Yunnan black crested gibbon (Nomascus concolor jingdongensis), Yunnan province, China
West Yunnan black crested gibbon (N. c. furvogaster), Yunnan province, China
Laotian black crested gibbon (N. c. lu), Laos
Tonkin black crested gibbon (N. c. concolor), northern Vietnam

Description 

The species exhibits sexual dichromatism, the male is completely black, while the female is a golden or buff colour with variable black patches, including a black streak on the head.

Behavior 

Gibbons are forest dwellers and are well known for their habit of swinging between the branches of the rainforest on their long arms, a method of locomotion known as brachiation. Gibbons are also adept, however, at walking upright, both on the ground and in the trees. Black crested gibbons live in small family groups consisting of a monogamous male and female and their offspring; occasionally groups reportedly may contain additional mature females. These apes are predominantly arboreal and the group forages and sleeps amongst the trees. Led by the female, the breeding pair partakes in vigorous bouts of singing in the morning, which hauntingly echo through the forest. These 'duets' are believed to be essential in pair bond formation and reinforcement, and also serve to advertise the presence of the group within the territory. A single young is born every two to three years and the infant is usually weaned once it reaches two years old;

Black crested gibbons feed preferentially on ripe, sugar-rich fruit, such as figs, but occasionally consume vitamin-rich leaf buds, and rarely eat animals.

Group living 

Black-crested gibbons live arboreally in small groups, most of which consist of a pair of adults, one male and one female, and their offspring.  It has been observed that some groups consist of one adult male living with two to four females and their offspring.  The group could potentially include one infant, one juvenile, one adolescent, and one sub adult. Groups have been found to be territorial, like other species of gibbons.  Territories are limited by the availability of the male for territory defense.  Thus, group and territory size would be limited.  With a large group, territory defense would not be favored by kin selection due to the group consisting of less-closely related individuals.
Though the research is not explicit, there can be some assumptions made about altruism within groups.  Since the majority of groups are living in monogamous relationships with both males and females displaying aggression when another individual enters, it is likely that kin selection plays a major role in determining behavior of the group.  Kin recognition is thought to be favored for maternal-offspring relationships.  This is largely due to primates' uncertainty over paternity, even in pair-bonding species due to female promiscuity. Social behaviors within groups will evolve according to Hamilton's rule.

Mating 

Gibbons were previously reported to practice monogamous sexual relationships. They are known to form pair bonds, as well documented in the majority of gibbon species. Upon the discovery of single male, multi-female living groups, the question arose to determine if all females were mating.  The observation that offspring of similar ages lived within a multi-female group confirmed that polygyny did in fact occur.  The current hypothesis remains that both monogamous and polygamous relationships exist. There may be various selection pressures for polygyny within previously monogamous groups.  Parents tend to be hostile towards maturing offspring, with males leaving the group more quickly than females do. Yet, upon tolerance by the mother, adult female offspring may remain in the group, as the group continues to forage and feed as family members.  The mutual tolerance of females is likely to be caused by "weak territoriality of females". Further selection occurs due to the birth interval for a single female averaging 2–2.5 years.  Male fitness would benefit from inseminating other females during a birth interval. This hypothesis is supported by the large scrotal size allowing for increased sperm production. Other observations have been made that males will share child carrying to place less of a burden on the female, delaying her interbirth time. The conflicting observations support the hypothesis that black-crested gibbons demonstrate both monogamous and polygamous sexual relationships.

Singing 

All gibbon species are known to produce loud and long song bouts, lasting for 10–30 minutes.  The black-crested gibbon sings in the morning, sometimes in duets initiated by the male.  The males choose the highest tree branches, often near ridges.  The songs are thought to be used for resource defense, mate defense, pairbonding, group cohesion and mate attraction.

Distribution and habitat 

The black crested gibbon has a discontinuous distribution across southwestern China, northwestern Laos, and northern Vietnam. One thousand years ago, gibbons which may have been crested gibbons (Nomascus) were found over a large part of southern and central China up to the Yellow River.

The four subspecies are geographically separated. The Tonkin black crested gibbon (Nomascus concolor concolor) occurs in southern China (southwestern Yunnan) and northern Vietnam (Lào Cai, Yên Bái, Sơn La, and Lai Châu provinces), between the Black and Red Rivers. The West Yunnan black crested gibbon (N. c. furvogaster) occurs in a small area near the Burma border, west of the Mekong, in southwestern Yunnan, southern China. The Central Yunnan black crested gibbon (N. c. jingdongensis) occurs in a small region around the Wuliang Mountains, between the Mekong and Chuanhe rivers in west-central Yunnan. The Laotian black crested gibbon (N. c. lu) occurs in northwestern Laos in an isolated population on the east bank of the Mekong in Laos.

The black crested gibbon inhabits tropical evergreen, semievergreen, deciduous forests in subtropical and mountainous areas. It generally lives in high altitudes, from 2100 to 2400 m above sea level, where most of their food resources are concentrated. In Vietnam and Laos, the species is found at lower altitudes, while in China, it has been observed as high as 2689 meters.

Conservation 

The black crested gibbon is listed as critically endangered on the IUCN Red List. An estimated 1300 to 2000 individuals are left in the wild. The western black crested gibbons were included on the State Forestry Bureau of China's list of 12 flagship and keystone species for biodiversity protection in 2021.

References

External links 
ARKive information page
Animal Diversity Web

black crested gibbon
Primates of East Asia
Primates of Southeast Asia
Mammals of China
Mammals of Laos
Mammals of Vietnam
Critically endangered fauna of Asia
Species endangered by use as food
Species endangered by human consumption for medicinal or magical purposes
Species endangered by logging
Species endangered by the pet trade
black crested gibbon
Taxa named by Richard Harlan
Critically endangered fauna of China